Mystery Man is a 1944 American Western film directed by George Archainbaud and written by J. Benton Cheney. The film stars William Boyd, Andy Clyde, Jimmy Rogers, Don Costello, Eleanor Stewart and Francis McDonald. The film was released on May 31, 1944, by United Artists.

Plot
Hoppy, California & Jimmy Rogers set out to stop a gang of bank robbers led by a man pretending to be respectable citizen.

Cast 
William Boyd as Hopalong Cassidy
Andy Clyde as California Carlson
Jimmy Rogers as Jimmy Rogers
Don Costello as Bud Trilling
Eleanor Stewart as Diane Newhall
Francis McDonald as Henchman Bert Rogan
Forrest Taylor as Sheriff Sam Newhall
Jack Rockwell as Marshal Ted Blane
John Merton as Henchman Bill
Pierce Lyden as Henchman Red
Bob Burns as Rancher Tom Hanlon
Ozie Waters as Tex

References

External links 
 

1944 films
American black-and-white films
Films directed by George Archainbaud
United Artists films
American Western (genre) films
1944 Western (genre) films
Hopalong Cassidy films
1940s English-language films
1940s American films